Moisés Carmona Rivera (31 October 1912 – ?) was a  sedevacantist traditionalist Catholic bishop from Acapulco, Guerrero, Mexico, who propagated sedevacantism in Mexico. He was one of the bishops consecrated by the Vietnamese sedevacantist bishop Ngô Đình Thục.

Biography

Priesthood

In November 1939, Carmona was ordained a priest by Bishop Leopoldo Díaz y Escudero of Chilapa (the Diocese of Acapulco was only split from the Diocese of Chilapa in 1958).

Carmona became a seminary professor.

Sedevacantism

When the reforms of the Second Vatican Council came to his parish, Iglesia Divina Providencia (Divine Providence Church), Carmona refused to conform.

In the 1970s, he, along with Father Joaquín Sáenz y Arriaga and Father Adolfo Zamora, formed the Tridentine Catholic Union (Union Católica Trento).

Episcopacy

In 1981, Carmona and Zamora were brought by the German sedevacantists Doctor Eberhard Heller and Doctor Kurt Hiller to the Vietnamese sedevacantist bishop Ngô Đình Thục in Toulon, France. Thục consecrated them bishops in Toulon on 17 October 1981.

Carmona formed consecrated four bishops: the Mexicans Benigno Bravo and Roberto Martinez y Gutiérrez, and the Americans George Musey and Mark Pivarunas, CMRI.

Death, burials, and aftermath

In 1996, Carmona's body was exhumed and transferred by Father (later Bishop) Martín Dávila Gandara of the SST to a crypt in a lower chapel below the Divine Providence Church. It is claimed that during the transference, Carmona's body showed no signs of decomposition, and that pictures taken of him when his body was put into the crypt looked the same at the time of his funeral.

References

1912 births
1991 deaths
People from Guerrero
People from Acapulco
Mexican traditionalist Catholics
Thục line bishops
Sedevacantists
Road incident deaths in Mexico
People excommunicated by the Catholic Church